Sleeping Dogs Lie is a 1998 film produced by Sullivan Entertainment and based on the true-life story of Ambrose Small, a Toronto millionaire who went missing after selling his chain of burlesque theatres for $1.7 million to Loew's movie theatres. The film is inspired by the book The Strange Case of Ambrose Small by Fred McClement. It stars Wendy Crewson as Mrs. Theresa Small.

The character of Ambrose Small also appears as a major character in the Michael Ondaatje novel, In the Skin of a Lion.

Synopsis
It's 1919 and wealthy Toronto theatre magnate Ambrose Small (Art Hindle) has just sold his chain of theatres for over a million dollars. But he doesn't get a chance to enjoy it. Shortly after his wife Theresa (Wendy Crewson) deposits the cheque in the bank, Ambrose mysteriously disappears without a trace. Ambrose's disappearance sets off a powder keg of accusations directed at Theresa and young detective Cole Willis (Joel Keller) is brought in for her protection. Cole is immediately infatuated with the beautiful and alluring widow and finds himself caught up in the growing scandal involving sex, drugs and seedy politics. Cole must wade through the lies, deceit and corruption that surround Theresa Small in order to find out if she is capable of murder.

Cast
 Wendy Crewson as Theresa Small 
 Joel S. Keller as Detective Cole Willis 
 Leon Pownall as Inspector Mitchell 
 Shawn Doyle as Hammond 
 Leslie Yeo as Daniel Small 
 Shannon Lawson as Vivian Doughty 
 Cedric Smith as J.J. Gallagher 
 Art Hindle as Ambrose Small 
 Eric Peterson as Jack Doughty 
 Michael Murphy as Edgar Tratt 
 Yoav Deckelbaum as Yosef Dolgoy 
 Susannah Hoffmann as Shayna Francov
 Richard Blackburn as Thomas Flynn
 Michael Caruana as Walter
 Brad Garrick as Tink 
 Rodger Barton as Marsh 
 Nicky Guadagni as Sister Rosaria 
 Marcia Bennett as Megan 
 Richard McMillan as Rainville 
 Alexandre Beaulieu as Marjorie

External links

Sullivanmovies.com - Official Sleeping Dogs Lie Page

References

1998 films
1998 drama films
English-language Canadian films
Canadian drama television films
1998 television films
1990s Canadian films
Works about missing people